Kayırlar is a village in the Pülümür District, Tunceli Province, Turkey. The village is populated by Kurds of the Şavalan tribe and had a population of 20 in 2021.

The hamlets of Aksu, Alagöz, Aşağıkayır, Bezeli, Çağlayan, Değirmendere, Deretarla, Gümüşdere, Katır, Kırmızıtarla, Komdere, Ortakayır, Pire, Sarıbudak, Sarımeşe, Söğütdere, Yarımca, Yoncalık and Yukarıkayır are attached to the village.

References 

Kurdish settlements in Tunceli Province
Villages in Pülümür District